Two ships of the Royal Navy have been named HMS Baltimore:

  was a 28-gun fifth rate launched in 1695
  was a sloop of war launched in 1742 converted to a bomb vessel in 1758 and sold in 1762
 

Royal Navy ship names